"Everyone's Gone to the Moon" is the debut single by British singer-songwriter and record producer Jonathan King. It was released in 1965 while King was still an undergraduate at Cambridge University. All copies of this single, in all territories and on all labels, spell the artist's first name (a stage name) as Johnathan. For all later singles, the spelling was rendered as Jonathan, and most compilation appearances of this track use the more conventional Jonathan spelling as well.

Chart performance
Released by Decca Records, it reached No. 4 in the UK, and No. 17 in the US Billboard Hot 100.

See also
 List of 1960s one-hit wonders in the United States

References

External links
Jonathan King official website
Jonathan King autobiography website

1965 songs
1965 debut singles
Jonathan King songs
Songs written by Jonathan King
Decca Records singles
Parrot Records singles
Song recordings produced by Jonathan King